Wang Zhen (born February 22, 1985) is a Chinese acrobatic gymnast that represented China at both the 2006 and 2004 World Championships.

References

1985 births
Living people
Chinese acrobatic gymnasts
Female acrobatic gymnasts
Medalists at the Acrobatic Gymnastics World Championships